Kings Weston Hill is a hill in the north of Bristol, England. The hill is a public open space managed as part of the Blaise Castle Estate. It takes its name from the settlement of Kings Weston, now absorbed into Lawrence Weston.

At the eastern end of Kings Weston Hill is the site of an Iron Age hill fort, which is a Scheduled Ancient Monument.

The hill is located between Kings Weston House to the southwest, and Blaise Castle to the northeast, and the hill is also the site of a tower for television broadcasting.

References 

Hills of Bristol
Iron Age sites in England
Hill forts in Bristol
Scheduled monuments in Bristol
Archaeological sites in Bristol
Parks and open spaces in Bristol